Helene Kvint (born December 27, 1972) is a  Danish performance artist and actress. Ms. Kvint lived and worked in Germany and the Czech Republic for many years and formed her own theatre group, Divadlo Antena, in 2001. She now lives in Copenhagen. She is currently engaged in two performance groups - the Danish group Coreact and the Prague-basef ensemble Secondhand Women. 

Among her most famous works are "Garden", "Ash", "Angel Files", "Mezzo", "Uzmuz", "Money Transformance" and "Frontier Alert".

External links

https://web.archive.org/web/20140414054040/http://www.secondhandwomen.cz/secondhand-women/helene-kvint/
http://www.coreact.dk

1972 births
Living people
Danish performance artists
Danish actresses